Breaksea Point is a promontory at the eastern edge of Gileston's Limpert Bay in the Vale of Glamorgan on the south coast of Wales. Breaksea Point is claimed as the southernmost point of mainland Wales, although that is also claimed of nearby Rhoose Point and the Vale of Glamorgan Council have placed a fixed notice to that effect.  Almost 20 km to the east, the Welsh island of Flat Holm is slightly further south in latitude.

Notes

External links 
www.geograph.co.uk : photos of Breaksea Point and surrounding area

St Athan
Headlands of the Vale of Glamorgan